Frances Scudamore may refer to:

Frances Scudamore, Viscountess Scudamore (1652–1694)
Frances Somerset, Duchess of Beaufort (1711–1750)
Frances Scudamore, Duchess of Norfolk (1750–1820)